The Kołbacz Abbey is a former Cistercian monastery located in Kołbacz, Poland. It had several subsidiaries, with the other main centers located in Oliwa, Bierzwnik, and Mironice. It was itself a subsidiary of Clairvaux Abbey, Ville-sous-la-Ferté, although the funding monks originally arrived from the Danish Esrum Abbey in Zealand. The abbey is listed as a Historic Monument of Poland.

The abbey was founded in 1173 with the original Latin name "Mera Vallis", but eventually the older Slavic name, Kołbacz became closely associated with the place. The monks were invited into Pomerania by Warcisław II Świętoborzyc, a castellan of Szczecin, as part of an agreement with Valdemar I of Denmark, who had besieged Szczecin and made Warcisław his vassal. The foundation was affirmed by Duke Bogusław I in 1173. The first abbot was Reinhold and the abbey began its activities in 1174.

The wealth of the Abbey was based on banking, as much as land ownership.

The abbey played an important role in the development of German settlements in the area, as the first villages of German-speaking inhabitants were founded close to the abbey.

Currently it is the site of an agricultural complex near Szczecin, which partly houses the Zoological Experimental Institute of the Kraków Technical Institute.

Gallery

References

See also
List of abbeys and priories in Europe

Buildings and structures in West Pomeranian Voivodeship
Christian monasteries established in the 12th century
Cistercian monasteries in Poland
Gothic architecture in Poland
Gryfino County
Religious organizations established in the 1170s